Major General Muhammad Hayat Khan was an Azad Kashmiri politician who served as the 15th President of Azad Kashmir from 1 November 1978 to 31 January 1983.

About 

He was born on 20 December 1928 in the house of Sardar Sher Ali Khan in Chhota Gala, a village in Tehsil Rawalakot, District Poonch, Azad Kashmir. He received his education from Government High School Rawalakot and was commissioned into the Pakistan Army on 15 November 1958. He was awarded with Sitare-Imtiaz and Sitare Bisalat.

In 1977, with the advice of all political parties, the Legislative Assembly of AJK and AJK Council had been dissolved  while Sardar Muhammad Ibrahim Khan was the president. Major General Habib Ur Rahman was appointed as the president of AJK. Shortly after, he resigned due to illness.

On 5 November 1977, Marshal Law was announced in Azad Jammu and Kashmir. General Muhammad Hayat Khan, a brigadier at the time, was appointed as the Caretaker, and later the president of AJK.

References

Presidents of Azad Kashmir
1928 births
2010 deaths